NextBox may refer to:

Xbox 360
Xbox One